Matthew David Taylor (born 8 July 1994) is an English cricketer. Taylor is a left-arm fast-medium bowler who bats right-handed. Taylor made his first-class debut for Gloucestershire on 3 September 2013 against Leicestershire.

References

External links
 
 

Living people
1994 births
English cricketers
Gloucestershire cricketers
Oxfordshire cricketers
Sportspeople from Banbury